Military slang is a colloquial language used by and associated with members of various military forces. This page lists slang words or phrases that originate with military forces, are used exclusively by military personnel or are strongly associated with military organizations.

Acronym slang
A number of military slang terms are acronyms. These include SNAFU, SUSFU, FUBAR, and similar terms used by various branches of the United States military during World War II.

BOHICA
BOHICA stands for Bend Over, Here It Comes Again. The meaning is that something undesirable is going to happen again and that there's not much else one can do other than just endure it.

The Log, the humour magazine written by and for Midshipmen at the United States Naval Academy, featured a series of comics entitled "The Bohica Brothers", dating back to the early 1970s.

FUBAR

FUBAR (Fucked/Fouled Up Beyond All Repair/Recognition), like SNAFU and SUSFU, dates from World War II. The Oxford English Dictionary lists Yank, the Army Weekly magazine (1944, 7 Jan. p. 8) as its earliest citation: "The FUBAR squadron. ‥ FUBAR? It means 'Fucked/Fouled Up Beyond All Recognition."

Another version of FUBAR, said to have originated in the military, gives its meaning as "Fucked Up By Assholes in the Rear". This version has at least surface validity in that it is a common belief among enlistees that most problems are created by the military brass (officers, especially those bearing the rank of general, from one to four stars). This version is also most likely to have had its origin in the U.S. Army, where the senior officers command from the rear, as opposed to a navy, where it is not uncommon for admirals to command a fleet from one of the ships at sea, and therefore susceptible to attacks and death by the enemy. Ditto as to air force generals, who do not fly and/or directly command airplanes or even squadrons or air wings. FUBAR had a resurgence in the American lexicon after the term was used in two popular movies: Tango and Cash (1989); and Saving Private Ryan (1998).

This particular FUBAR acronym survived WWII and for a time, mainly in the 1970s, found its way into the lexicon of management consultants. Although the word “rear” is not normally used to describe the vantage point of senior corporate executives, their use of the term might have come about as the result of their frequent conclusions that the cause of corporate problems (inefficiencies and ineffectiveness causing poor profitability or a negative bottom line) rested not with rank and file workers, but rather with executives, particularly senior executives – the equivalent of senior military officers.

One possible origin of the term comes from the german word "Furchtbar" meaning frightful, negative, or bad. A skilled german speaker pronouncing the word would say something which to an anglo would sound like "Foitebar". Being unable to collectively pronounce the german "rcht" spelling inflection, but knowing the words pronunciation wasn't greatly modified by it, an anglo would naturally simplify it to "Fuubar/Fubar" in common usage. A similar scenario had occurred with french "M'aider" becoming "Mayday" in WWI, with contractions not being common in english verbs it was translated as a single word.

FUBU

FUBU (Fucked/Fouled Up Beyond all Understanding) was also used during World War II.

FRED

FRED (Fucking Ridiculous Eating Device) is a slang term in the Australian Army used to refer to the Field Ration Eating Device attached to each ration pack.

SNAFU

SNAFU is widely used to stand for the sarcastic expression Situation Normal: All Fucked Up, as a well-known example of military acronym slang. However, the military acronym originally stood for "Status Nominal: All Fucked Up." It is sometimes bowdlerized to all fouled up or similar. It means that the situation is bad, but that this is a normal state of affairs. It is typically used in a joking manner to describe something that is working as intended. The acronym is believed to have originated in the United States Marine Corps during World War II.

Time magazine used the term in their June 16, 1942 issue: "Last week U.S. citizens knew that gasoline rationing and rubber requisitioning were snafu." Most reference works, including the Random House Webster's Unabridged Dictionary, supply an origin date of 1940–1944, generally attributing it to the United States Army.

Rick Atkinson ascribes the origin of SNAFU, FUBAR, and a bevy of other terms to cynical G.I.s ridiculing the Army's penchant for acronyms.

Private Snafu is the title character of a series of military instructional films, most of which were written by Theodor "Dr. Seuss" Geisel, Philip D. Eastman, and Munro Leaf.

In modern usage, snafu is sometimes used as an interjection, although it is mostly now used as a noun. Snafu also sometimes refers to a bad situation, mistake, or cause of the trouble. It is more commonly used in modern vernacular to describe running into an error or problem that is large and unexpected. For example, in 2005, The New York Times published an article titled "Hospital Staff Cutback Blamed for Test Result Snafu".

The attribution of SNAFU to the American military is not universally accepted: it has also been attributed to the British, although the Oxford English Dictionary gives its origin and first recorded use as the U.S. military.

In 1946, as part of a wider study of military slang, Frederick Elkin noted: "...[there] are a few acceptable substitutes, such as 'screw up' or 'mess up', but these do not have the emphasis value of the obscene equivalent." He considered the expression SNAFU to be: "...a caricature of Army direction. The soldier resignedly accepts his own less responsible position and expresses his cynicism at the inefficiency of Army authority." He also noted that "the expression … is coming into general civilian use."

An Imperial FU
An Imperial FU (An Imperial Fuck Up) was used during World War I by soldiers of the outlying British Empire, e.g. Canada, Australia, New Zealand, the Union of South Africa, Kenya, Tanganyika, India, in reference to odd/conflicting orders from British authorities. Note that during World War I, the British Empire had an Imperial War Cabinet, and the troops from Australia were called the Australian Imperial Force (AIF), not to be confused with the AEF, the American Expeditionary Forces of WWI, or the Allied Expeditionary Force of WWII.

SUSFU

SUSFU (Situation Unchanged: Still Fucked Up) is closely related to SNAFU.

SNAFU and SUSFU were first recorded in American Notes and Queries in their September 13, 1941 issue.

TARFU
TARFU (Totally And Royally Fucked Up or Things Are Really Fucked Up) was also used during World War II.

The 1944 U.S. Army animated shorts Three Brothers and Private Snafu Presents Seaman Tarfu In The Navy (both directed by Friz Freleng), feature the characters Private Snafu, Private Fubar, and Seaman Tarfu (with a cameo by Bugs Bunny).

Tommy and the Poor Bloody Infantry
Tommy Atkins (often just Tommy) is slang for a common soldier in the British Army, but many soldiers preferred the terms PBI (poor bloody infantry) "P.B.I." was a pseudonym of a contributor to the First World War trench magazine The Wipers Times.

See also
 List of government and military acronyms
 List of U.S. government and military acronyms
 List of United States Marine Corps acronyms and expressions
 List of U.S. Navy acronyms and expressions
 List of U.S. Air Force acronyms and expressions
 FUBAR (film), a 2002 mockumentary by Michael Dowse

References

Further reading
 
 
 
 
 

BOHICA by Scott Barnes published 1987

External links

 :Wiktionary:Appendix:Glossary of military slang
 :Wiktionary:Category:Military slang by language
 Meaning of SNAFU on Dictionary.com
 Acronym Finder's SNAFU entry
 Acronym Finder's FUBAR entry
 Command Performance Episode 101 from 15 Jan 1944 (MP3 6M) includes a song about SNAFU by the Spike Jones band.
 Glossary of Military Terms & Slang from the Vietnam War
 How the term SNAFU originated
 Internet Archive: Private SNAFU – The Home Front (1943) – This is one of 26 Private SNAFU cartoons made by the US Army Signal Corps to educate and boost the morale of the troops.
 SNAFU Principle
 The SNAFU Special – Official website of the C-47 #43-15073
 World Wide Words, Michael Quinion, Acronyms for your Enjoyment.

Military slang and jargon
Profanity
Military slang